ULF 2 may refer to:
 EEL ULF 2, motorglider
 Space Shuttle mission STS-126